Andrew Pyle (born  1963) is a Canadian economist, currently an advisor and portfolio manager with CIBC Wood Gundy in Peterborough, Ontario. Andrew also writes a weekly newsletter which can be found at pyle-group.com and also provides a monthly conference call. He also appears on BNN Bloomberg as well as other media outlets. He was previously  Scotia Economics vice-president and Head of Capital Market Research. Prior to that he was ABN AMRO's Chief Canadian Strategist. He is regularly featured in economic stories of such Canadian national media outlets as the National Post and the Globe and Mail.

Pyle graduated from the University of Toronto.

References

External links
 PyleWealthManagement: Andrew Pyle, MA
 Andrewpyle: Andrew Pyle, MA
 ScotiaMcLeod: Andrew Pyle profile

1960s births
Living people
Canadian economists
People from Peterborough, Ontario
University of Toronto alumni